The men's 66 kilograms (half lightweight) competition at the 2010 Asian Games in Guangzhou was held on 15 November at the Huagong Gymnasium.

Schedule
All times are China Standard Time (UTC+08:00)

Results
Legend
WO — Won by walkover

Main bracket

Final

Top half

Bottom half

Repechage

References
Results

External links
Draw

M66
Judo at the Asian Games Men's Half Lightweight